Gueuze  is a type of lambic, a Belgian beer. It is made by blending young (1-year-old) and old (2- to 3-year-old) lambics, which is bottled for a second fermentation. Because the young lambics are not fully fermented, the blended beer contains fermentable sugars, which allow a second fermentation to occur. 

Due to its lambic blend, gueuze has a different flavor than traditional ales and lagers. Because of their use of aged hops, lambics lack the characteristic hop aroma or flavor found in most other beers. Furthermore, the wild yeasts that are specific to lambic-style beers give gueuze a dry, cider-like, musty, sour, acetic acid, lactic acid taste. Many describe the taste as sour and "barnyard-like". Because of its carbonation, gueuze is sometimes called "Brussels Champagne".

In modern times, some brewers have added sweeteners such as aspartame to their gueuzes to sweeten them, trying to make the beer more appealing to a wider audience. The original, unsweetened version is often referred to as "Oude Gueuze" ("Old Gueuze") and became more popular in the early 2000s. Tim Webb, a British writer on Belgian and other beers, comments on the correct use of the term Oude gueuze' or 'oude geuze', now legally defined and referring to a drink made by blending two or more 100% lambic beer."

Traditionally, gueuze is served in champagne bottles, which hold either . Traditionally, gueuze, and the lambics from which it is made, has been produced in the area known as Pajottenland and in Brussels. However, some non-Pajottenland/Brussels lambic brewers have sprung up and one or two also produce gueuze – see table below. Gueuze (both 'Oude' and others) qualified for the European Union's designation 'TSG' (Traditional Speciality Guaranteed) in 1997/98.

Etymology
The name was first seen as the Flemish word 'geuze-bier' in a French text in 1829.

There is some debate on where the word gueuze originated. One theory is that it originated from geysa (geyser), Old Norse for gush, since, during times of vigorous fermentation, gueuze will spew out of the bunghole of its enclosing oak barrel.. Another one derives it from a street called 'Geuzenstraat' (Geuzen Street) in Brussels, but such a street does not exist there.

Another theory derives it from the French word 'gueuse' (meaning pig iron or raw iron), as originally, gueuze was defined as raw (unblended), aged, but fine-tasting lambic.

Méthode Traditionnelle
Some American craft breweries have begun blending young and old sour beers, to produce their own versions of the traditional gueuze. In 2016 Jester King Brewery released a blended, spontaneously fermented beer which it labelled as "Méthode Gueuze." However, the High Council for Artisanal Lambic Beers (HORAL) objected to the name, and the two parties arranged a meeting in Belgium. It was agreed that in future the American brewers would use the designation "Méthode Traditionelle" as a style name.

Commercial production of Gueuze 
Commercial production of gueuze commenced in the 19th century; modern breweries that produce gueuze include: 
3 Fonteinen
Boon
Belle-Vue
Cantillon
De Cam
Girardin
Hanssens
Lindemans
Mort Subite
Oud Beersel
De Troch
Tilquin
Timmermans

Both gueuze and lambic are protected under Belgian (since 1965) and European (since 1992) law.

Oude Geuze breweries and beers

Information extracted from Webb.

Pajottenland / Brussels

Boon
Mariage parfait Oude Gueuze (8%)
Moriau Oude Gueuze (7%)
Oude Gueuze (7%)
Dekoninck Gueuze (6%)
Cantillon
Gueuze 100% lambic (5%)
Lou Pepe Gueuze (5%)
De Cam Oude Gueuze (6.5%) 
De Troch Cuvée Chapeau Oude Gueuze (5.5%)
3 Fonteinen
Vintage Oude Gueuze (8%)
Oude Gueuze (6%)
Millennium Gueuze (7%)
50e Anniversary Gueuze (6%)
Girardin
1882 Gueuze black label (5%)
1882 Gueuze white label (5%)
Hanssens Artisanaal Oude Gueuze (6%)
Lindemans Cuvée René Oude Gueuze (5.5%)
Mort Subite Natural Oude Gueuze (7.2%)
Oud Beersel Oude Gueuze (6%)
Timmermans 'Limited Edition' Oude Gueuze (5.5%)

Non-Pajottenland / Brussels
Gueuzerie Tilquin - Oude Gueuze Tilquin à l'Ancienne (6.4%)
Van Honsebrouck - Gueuze Fond Tradition (5%)

Gallery of Oude Geuze producers

See also
 HORAL
 Sour beer
 Barrel-aged beer

References

Bibliography

External links
 
Gueuze & Lambic  Belgian beer styles from BeerTourism.com

Beer in Belgium
Beer styles
Traditional Speciality Guaranteed products from Belgium